4349 Tibúrcio, provisional designation , is a dark asteroid from the central region of the asteroid belt, approximately 29 kilometers in diameter. It was discovered on 5 June 1989, by German astronomer Werner Landgraf at ESO's La Silla Observatory in northern Chile.

With 53.5°, it had been the asteroid with the smallest angular distance from the Sun ever discovered. It was later named after Brazilian amateur astronomer Júlio Tibúrcio.

Orbit and classification 

Tibúrcio orbits the Sun in the central main-belt at a distance of 2.0–3.3 AU once every 4 years and 3 months (1,550 days). Its orbit has an eccentricity of 0.24 and an inclination of 11° with respect to the ecliptic.

Physical characteristics 

The asteroid has been characterized as an X-type asteroid by Pan-STARRS large-scale photometric survey.

Rotation period 

A rotational lightcurve of Tibúrcio was obtained from photometric observations by astronomer David Higgins at the Australian Hunters Hill Observatory in October 2010. Lightcurve analysis gave a well-defined rotation period of 16.284 hours with a brightness variation of 0.40 magnitude.

Diameter and albedo 

According to the space-based surveys carried out by the Infrared Astronomical Satellite IRAS, the Japanese Akari satellite, and NASA's Wide-field Infrared Survey Explorer with its NEOWISE mission, Tibúrcio measures between 24.9 and 30.23 kilometers in diameter, and its surface has a low albedo between 0.034 and 0.061.

Collaborative Asteroid Lightcurve Link assumes an albedo of 0.049 and calculates a diameter of 26.1 kilometers with an absolute magnitude of 11.8.

Naming 

This minor planet was named after Brazilian amateur astronomer and student of information science, Júlio César dos Santos Tibúrcio. The official naming citation was published by the Minor Planet Center on 8 June 1990.

Notes

References

External links 
 Asteroid Lightcurve Database (LCDB), query form (info )
 Dictionary of Minor Planet Names, Google books
 Asteroids and comets rotation curves, CdR – Observatoire de Genève, Raoul Behrend
 Discovery Circumstances: Numbered Minor Planets (1)-(5000) – Minor Planet Center
 
 

004349
Discoveries by Werner Landgraf
Named minor planets
19890605